Coenites is an extinct genus of prehistoric corals in the family Coenitidae. C dublinensis occurs in the Columbus Limestone, a mapped bedrock unit consisting primarily of fossiliferous limestone, and it occurs in Ohio, Pennsylvania, and Virginia in the United States, and in Ontario, Canada.

See also 
 List of prehistoric hexacoral genera

References 

 The Systematic Position of Coenites Eichwald. Krister Brood, Geologiska Föreningen i Stockholm Förhandlingar, Volume 92, 1970, Issue 4, 
 Coral versus bryozoan affinities of Coenites-like branches from northeastern North American Silurian reefs. CE Davidheiser and RJ Cuffe, Geological Society of America, Abstracts with Programs, 1981

External links 
 

Prehistoric Hexacorallia genera
Tabulata
Paleontology in New Jersey
Paleozoic life of Ontario
Paleozoic life of British Columbia
Paleozoic life of Manitoba
Paleozoic life of Nunavut
Paleozoic life of Quebec